18 Draconis is a likely binary star system in the northern circumpolar constellation of Draco. With an apparent visual magnitude of 4.84, it is just bright enough to be faintly visible to the naked eye. It is moving closer to the Sun with a heliocentric radial velocity of −1.4 km/s, and is a probable member of the Sirius stream of co-moving stars.

At the age of around 280 million years, it is most likely (99% chance) on the horizontal branch. It is a barium star, which suggests it may have a degenerate white dwarf companion from which it accreted materials during an earlier stage of its evolution. 18 Dra has an estimated 3.8 times the mass of the Sun and has expanded to 47 times the Sun's radius. The star is radiating 787 times the Sun's luminosity from its enlarged photosphere at an effective temperature of 4,471 K.

References

K-type giants
Barium stars
Binary stars
Draco (constellation)
Draconis, g
Durchmusterung objects
Draconis, 18
151101
081660
6223